Qinhuangdao railway station is a railway station located in the city of Qinhuangdao, in Hebei, China.

Railway stations in China opened in 1984
Railway stations in Hebei
Stations on the Beijing–Harbin Railway